Naalaya Seidhi is a 1992 Indian Tamil-language action thriller film, directed by G. B. Vijay and produced by K. S. Srinivasan and K. S. Shivaraman. The film stars Prabhu, Khushbu, Goundamani and Senthil.

Plot

Cast 

 Prabhu as Madhan / Manmadhan
 Khushbu as Anu / Anuradha
 Goundamani
 Senthil
 Jai Ganesh
 Jaishankar as Dhakshinamoorthy
 Rocky
 Archana Puran Singh (debut)
 C. R. Saraswathi as Savithiri (Madhan Step Mother)
 Yuvasree
 S. R. Vijaya
 Kavithasree
 Baby Priyanka
 Charuhasan
 Vasanth
 Sethu Vinayagam
 K. S. G. Venkatesh
 Raviraj
 Narasimhan
 Srikanth
 Gopi
 Ponnambalam
 Kullamani
 Omakuchi Narasimhan
Swaminathan

Production 
Naalaya Seidhi is the directorial debut of G. B. Vijay.

Soundtrack 
Soundtrack was composed by Adithyan. For the dubbed Telugu version Repati Vaartha, all lyrics were written by Rajasri.

Release and reception 
Naalaya Seidhi was initially scheduled to release in July 1992, but released on 14 August. Malini Mannath of The Indian Express wrote, "There is never a dull moment though at times the screenplay sounds illogical". K. Vijiyan of New Straits Times called it "a gripping, fast-moving story, with punchy, witty dialogue".

References

External links 
 

1990s Tamil-language films
1992 action thriller films
1992 films
1992 directorial debut films
Films about journalists
Indian action thriller films